Juhani Komulainen (born 22 April 1953 in Jämsänkoski, Finland) is a Finnish composer of modern classical music. He lives in Helsinki.

Biography
Juhani Komulainen has studied composition at the University of Miami in the U.S., and with Einojuhani Rautavaara in Finland. He gained a reputation in the 1990s through his successful participation in several Finnish and international competitions. His choral music combines a melodic propensity, a lyrical basic mood, a soft brand of free tonality and a style-independent freedom of expression.

The compositions of Juhani Komulainen are performed at international music festivals, choral competitions and workshops. He is working extensively with Finnish choirs and vocal groups creating a wide range of new choral compositions which have been recently premiered at concerts and recordings by numerous choirs including Academic Female Choir Lyran, The EOL Chamber Choir, Vocal Ensemble Fiori, Jubilate Chamber Choir, Kampin Laulu chamber choir, Vocal Ensemble Lumen Valo and the Tapiola Choir.

Selected works
Choral Works: Mixed Choir
Salve, flos et decor (Tervehditty ollos, armoitettu)
Cat Morgan Introduces Himself. 1st prize in the South Coast Choral Society Composition Competition, California, U.S., 1986
Sade (Rain). Text by Leena Saarisalo ( in Finnish )
Three sonnets of Shakespeare
Four ballads of Shakespeare. 1st prize in the composition competition of the Helsinki Chapter of SULASOL, 1994
Herra, minun valoni (Lord, You are my light)
Satu (Saga)
Matka Eedeniin (Journey to Eden)
Fantaisies Decoratives I (Le Panneau - The Panel)
Fantaisies Decoratives II (Les Ballons - The Balloons)
Cycle sur St. Martin
Haltian herätys (Awakening of the elf)
Keltainen Nocturne (Yellow Nocturne)
Vaellus (Journey)
The Song of Solomon
Herra kanssas olkohon
Jesu Christe pie
Shall I compare thee...
Nyt ilovirttä veisaten (In dulci jubilo)
Nyt sieluni ylös (Siionin virsi)
Särkyköön mun sydämeni (Siionin virsi)

Choral Works: Treble Voices
Muurahaisten laulu (The Song of the Ants)
Sade (Rain). Text by Leena Saarisalo (in Finnish)
Antakaa lasten tulla (Let the children come). 1st prize in the 1992 Lohtaja Church Music Festival composition competition
Kuin sinapinsiemen. 1st prize in the 1992 Lohtaja Church Music Festival composition competition
Kudontalaulu (Knitting Song)
Polulla (On the trail)
Muisto (Memory)
Suvikuvia (Summer Scenes)
Shakesperean Settings
Syyskesän ilta (The late summer evening)
Vocalise
The Tide Rises, the Tide Falls
Kaksi yösonettia (Two Nocturnal Sonnets)
Call of the sea

Choral Works: Male Choir
Nouskaa te ruhtinaat
Metsä palaa (The forest is burning)
Metsässä (In the forest)
Three Landscapes of T. S. Eliot
most people

Works for Choir and Orchestra
Mysterium

Works for Soloist, Choir and Orchestra or Ensemble
Profeetan kutsuminen (Calling of a Prophet)
Sytytän kynttilän (Lighting a candle)

Works for String Orchestra
Bothnian Dance and Ballad

Electro-acoustic Works
Kalevala

Works for Solo Instrument
Ballade for piano
Aria magico
homage

Chamber Works
Impressioni
The Ides of March

Arrangements
Jesper Swedberg (1694): Lova Gud i himmelshöjd

External links
Juhani Komulainen in Profile

1953 births
Living people
20th-century classical composers
21st-century classical composers
Finnish classical composers
Musicians from Helsinki
University of Miami Frost School of Music alumni
Finnish male classical composers
20th-century male musicians
21st-century male musicians
20th-century Finnish composers
21st-century Finnish composers